Donato Frisia (1883–1953) was an Italian painter.

Biography
Frisia was born in Merate, Province of Lecco. He studied at the Brera Academy in Milan from 1905 to 1910. He was one of Emilio Gola’s circle of friends and took part in the Esposizione Nazionale di Belle Arti at the Società per le Belle Arti ed Esposizione Permanente di Milano for the first time in 1910. Noted for his execution of funerary monuments, he focused primarily in painting on landscapes and still lifes. His participation in the Venice Biennale began with the 11th Esposizione Internazionale d’Arte della Città di Venezia in 1914 and included a personal room at the 23rd Esposizione Internazionale di Venezia in 1942. After serving in World War I he made numerous journeys, above all to Paris. He was awarded the Mylius Prize by the Milan Academy of Fine Arts in 1921 and the Prince Umberto Prize in 1922. His travels continued in the 1930s, including trips to North Africa.

References
 Antonella Crippa, Donato Frisia, online catalogue Artgate by Fondazione Cariplo, 2010, CC BY-SA (source for the first revision of this article).

Other projects

19th-century Italian painters
Italian male painters
20th-century Italian painters
20th-century Italian male artists
Painters from Milan
Italian landscape painters
Brera Academy alumni
1883 births
1953 deaths
19th-century Italian male artists